Former names:  Prefecture Apostolic of Alaska (1894-1917), Vicariate Apostolic of Alaska (1917-1962).

The Roman Catholic Diocese of Fairbanks is an ecclesiastical territory, or diocese, of the Roman Catholic Church in the northern part of the state of Alaska in the United States.

The Diocese of Fairbanks is led by a bishop who serves as pastor of the mother church, Sacred Heart Cathedral in the City of Fairbanks.  The diocese is a suffragan of the Archdiocese of Anchorage-Juneau. As of February 2023, the post of bishop is vacant.

History

1867 to 1951 
When the United States purchased Alaska in 1867 from the Empire of Russia, it was under the jurisdiction of the Diocese of Vancouver Island in Canada. Bishop Charles Seghers of that diocese made several missionary trips to Alaska during the early 1870's.  He later sent Reverend John Althoff, a Dutch priest, to create missions in Wrangell, Alaska, the Cassiar mining district on the Stikine River, and the former Russian capital of Sitka, Alaska.  Althoff established the first permanent Catholic presence in Alaska when he founded Saint Rose of Lima Parish in Wrangell on May 3, 1879.  After the discovery of gold near Juneau, Alaska,  Althoff moved there. He celebrated the first mass and baptism in Juneau in an interdenominational "Log Cabin Church" on July 17. 1882.

In May 1886, Seghers was murdered by a traveling companion near Nulato, Alaska, while on a missionary trip. After learning of Segher's death, Reverend Pascal Tosi of the Society of Jesus unilaterally took control of the Alaska missions. Later that summer in the Pacific Northwest of the United States, the Jesuit superior of the Rocky Mountain Mission, Joseph M. Cataldo, appointed Tosi as superior of the Alaska mission

On July 27, 1894, Pope Leo XIII erected the Prefecture Apostolic of Alaska.  He transferred all of Alaska from the Canadian Dioceses of Vancouver Island and New Westminster andappointed Tosi as the prefect apostolic. Due to poor health, Tosi was forced to resign in 1897; Leo XIII replaced him with Reverend Jean-Baptiste René from the Society of Jesus.  When Rene resigned in 1904, Pope Pius X named Joseph Crimont of the Society of Jesus as what would be the last prefect apostolic.    

On December 22, 1916, Pope Benedict XV elevated the Prefecture Apostolic of Alaska to the Vicariate Apostolic of Alaska.  He appointed Crimont as its first vicar apostolic on February 15, 1917 and made him a bishop. In 1948, Pope Pius XII appointed Reverend Francis Gleeson of the Society of Jesus to lead the vicariate.

1951 to present 
On June 23, 1951, Pope Pius XII erected the Diocese of Juneau.  He dissolved the existing vicariate and moved all of southern Alaska into the new diocese.  The remainder of the state became the new Vicariate of Northern Alaska, with its episcopal see in Fairbanks.  Pius XII appointed Gleeson as bishop of the new vicariate.  

On August 8. 1962, Pope John XXIII suppressed the Vicariate of Northern Alaska and replaced it with the new Diocese of Fairbanks, with Gleeson as its first bishop. On January 22, 1966, Pope Paul VI erected the Archdiocese of Anchorage and assigned the Diocese of Fairbanks to it as a suffragan. To assist Gleeson, Pope Paul VI on December 6, 1967,named Reverend Robert Whelan of the Society of Jesus as coadjutor bishop of the Diocese of Fairbanks.

After Gleeson retired in 1968, Whelan automatically succeeded him as bishop. Whalen made numerous trips by bush plane, boat and snowmobile to remote Native American and Native Alaskan villages throughout the diocese. He established the Native Diaconate Program, ordaining 28 Native Alaskan men to the permanent diaconate. Pope John Paul II named Reverend Michael Kaniecki of the Society of Jesus as coadjutor bishop on March 8, 1984, Whelan's resignation as bishop of Fairbanks was accepted by the pope on June 1, 1985.  Kaniecki automatically succeeded him at that time.  

Kaniecki died suddenly in 2000. On June 7, 2002, John Paul II appointed Reverend Donald Kettler of the Diocese of Sioux Falls as the first non-Jesuit Bishop of Fairbanks.  Pope Benedict XVI appointed Kettler as bishop of the Diocese of St. Cloud in 2013 and replaced him in Alaska with Reverend Chad Zielinski from the Archdiocese for the Military Services, USA.

On November 12, 2019, the Vatican removed the Diocese of Fairbanks from its list of missionary dioceses, transferring control of the diocese from the Congregation for the Evangelization of Peoples to the Congregation for Bishops. Zielinski said that he hoped the move would help the shortage of priests in the diocese.  At the time of that announcement, the diocese had only 17 priests to staff 46 parishes and missions.

On September 17, 2020, Pope Francis suppressed the Diocese of Anchorage and the Diocese of Juneau and erected the Archdiocese of Anchorage-Juneau.  He designated the Diocese of Fairbanks as the only suffragan of the new archdiocese.  Francis appointed Zielinksi in 2022 as bishop of the Diocese of New Ulm.  As of February 2023, Francis has not appointed a new bishop.  Archbishop Andrew Bellisario is serving as the apostolic administrator.

Sexual abuse cases

In 1969, Bishop Whelan granted the request for Joseph Lundowski, a lay volunteer, to officially distribute communion at St. Michaels Parish in a remote Alaskan village.  Lundowski was neither a priest or a deacon.  In 1964, Vicar General Father John E. Gurr had received a letter from a priest that complained that Lundowski was sexually abusing boys in his parish.  The diocese took no action. After a local resident spotting Lundowski molesting a young boy, he exposed the scandal in the village.  The local priest, himself accused later of child molestation, immediately flew Lundowski out of the village.

In February 2008, the diocese announced plans to file for Chapter 11 bankruptcy.  It claimed an inability to pay settlements to the 140 plaintiffs who had filed claims against the diocese for sexual abuse by priests or church workers. The Society of Jesus, Oregon Province, was named as a co-defendant in the case, and settled for $50 million. The diocese, which reported an operating budget then of approximately $6 million, claimed that one of the diocese's insurance carriers failed to "participate meaningfully". When the diocese filed for bankruptcy in 2012, it acknowledged that reports of abuse spanned "over the last six decades." Over time, the diocese's list of "credibly accused" clergy grew as well.

Bishops and other ordinaries

Prefects Apostolic of Alaska
 Pascal Tosi (1894–1897)
 Jean-Baptiste René (1897–1904)
 Joseph Raphael John Crimont (1904–1917), appointed Vicar Apostolic of Alaska

Vicars Apostolic of Alaska
 Joseph Raphael John Crimont (1917–1945)
 Walter James Fitzgerald (1945–1947)
 Francis Doyle Gleeson (1948–1951), title changed with change of title of vicariate apostolic

Vicar Apostolic of Northern Alaska
 Francis Doyle Gleeson (1951-1962); Appointed first Bishop of Fairbanks

Bishops of Fairbanks
 Francis Doyle Gleeson (1962–1968)  - George Theodore Boileau (Coadjutor Bishop 1964–1965), died before succession
 Robert Louis Whelan (1968–1985)
 Michael Joseph Kaniecki (1985–2000)
 Donald Joseph Kettler (2002–2013), appointed Bishop of Saint Cloud
 Chad William Zielinski (2014–2022), appointed Bishop of New Ulm

Other priest of the Vicariate of Alaska who became a bishop
 Robert Dermot O'Flanagan, appointed Bishop of Juneau in 1951

Education 
The diocese has 2 schools for education.
 Immaculate Conception Elementary, Fairbanks
 Monroe Catholic High School, Fairbanks

Health care
Hospital ministry - Catholic services to the sick & injured in existing hospitals & nursing homes.
Stephen ministry - interdenominational companions for people in grief, illness, loss, family breakdown, etc.

Media
The diocese provides communication to its community by:
 The Alaskan Shepherd, a newsletter
 KNOM radio. Established in 1971, KNOM is the oldest Catholic radio station in the country.
 KQHE radio. Established in 2012.

See also

 Ecclesiastical Province of Anchorage
 Historical list of the Catholic bishops of the United States
 List of Roman Catholic archdioceses (by country and continent)
 List of Roman Catholic dioceses (alphabetical) (including archdioceses)
 List of Roman Catholic dioceses (structured view) (including archdioceses)

Footnotes

External links
 Roman Catholic Diocese of Fairbanks Official Site 
 Official site of the Holy See

 
Non-profit organizations based in Fairbanks, Alaska
Religious organizations established in 1894
Fairbanks
Fairbanks
Fairbanks
Companies that filed for Chapter 11 bankruptcy in 2008